An election to the Neath Rural District Council in West Glamorgan, Wales was held in April 1937. It was preceded by the 1934 election  and was followed, as the 1940 and 1943 elections were postponed due to the Second World War, by the 1946 election.

Overview of the results
Having won control of the authority for the first time in 1934, Labour consolidated their position by winning a number of additional seats across the area with the Independent group, which previously controlled the authority, reduced to only six members.

Candidates
Most seats were contested although a number of Labour candidates were returned unopposed including former chairmen William Jones (Tonmawr) and John James (Onllwyn) even though they had fallen out with their own party a few months earlier.

A feature of the election was the decision of a number of long-serving Independent members not to seek re-election. These included Ogley David, father of the Council and a member for many years, who had also recently stood down from the Glamorgan County Council. His brother, Isaac David, also stood down.

Outcome
Labour captured a number of seats from the Independents, including two vacated by Independents at Blaenrhonddan, another two at Skewen (where the former Glamorgan county councillor W.P. Jenkins headed the poll), and a further seat at Crynant. Labour also regained the seat at Resolven lost at a by-election a few years previously.

Ward Results

Baglan Higher (one seat)

Blaengwrach (one seats)

Blaenrhonddan (three seats)

Clyne (one seats)

Coedffranc (five seats)

Dyffryn Clydach (two seats)

Dulais Higher, Crynant Ward (one seat)

Dulais Higher, Onllwyn Ward (one seat)

Dulais Higher, Seven Sisters Ward (two seats)

Dulais Lower (one seat)

Michaelstone Higher (one seat)

Neath Higher (three seats)

Neath Lower (one seat)

Resolven, Cwmgwrach Ward (one seat)

Resolven, Resolven Ward (two seats)

Resolven, Rhigos Ward (two seats)

Resolven, Tonna Ward (one seat)

References

1937 Welsh local elections